Joel Harvey Slomsky (born 1946) is a senior United States district judge of the United States District Court for the Eastern District of Pennsylvania.

Education and career

Born in Brooklyn, New York, Slomsky received a Bachelor of Arts degree from Brooklyn College in 1967 and a Juris Doctor from New York Law School in 1970. He was a Special Attorney of the Criminal Division, Philadelphia Strike Force, United States Department of Justice from 1971 to 1973. He was in private practice in Pennsylvania from 1973 to 2008.

Federal judicial service

On July 24, 2008, Slomsky was nominated by President George W. Bush to a seat on the United States District Court for the Eastern District of Pennsylvania vacated by James T. Giles. Slomsky was confirmed by the United States Senate on September 26, 2008, and received his commission on October 6, 2008. He assumed senior status on October 9, 2018.

Sources

1946 births
Living people
Brooklyn College alumni
Judges of the United States District Court for the Eastern District of Pennsylvania
New York Law School alumni
People from Atlanta
United States district court judges appointed by George W. Bush
21st-century American judges
United States Department of Justice lawyers